Eben Joubert (born 30 June 1983 in Johannesburg, South Africa) was a South African rugby union player playing in New Zealand for Otago in the ITM Cup competition. He was named Otago captain in 2011.

Playing career

After attending the University of Pretoria, Joubert spent some time on the fringes of the Blue Bulls provincial squad, making a single appearance during both the Currie Cup and Vodacom Cup in 2007. Considered undersized for a flanker in his native South Africa, in 2008 he accepted an offer to come to New Zealand in an attempt to further his chances at a professional career.

After making a strong impression in club rugby in Dunedin, he was selected to the Otago side for the 2008 Air New Zealand Cup. After making regular appearances in 2008 and 2009, his career suffered a serious setback in a Ranfurly Shield game against Southland early in the 2010 ITM Cup campaign, when he suffered a serious shoulder injury which ruled him out for the season. The injury was further complicated by an infection after surgery which left him hospitalized for nearly two months.

Back healthy for the 2011 ITM Cup, Joubert was named the captain of the Otago squad. He helped get his side off to a terrific start, scoring his first two provincial tries in an opening-week victory over North Harbour, and then led Otago to their first victory in Auckland since 1976. However, his season was ended after 4 matches by a damaged knee.

Eben now lives in the Netherlands with his family where he is a director for Hilti and is married to Melanie Joubert, co-founder of beauty brand Sweet Rumour.

References

External links
 Otago Profile

1983 births
Living people
South African rugby union players
Otago rugby union players
Rugby union flankers
Rugby union players from Johannesburg
University of Pretoria alumni